The Houston County Farm Center is a 5,000-seat multi-purpose arena in Dothan, Alabama, USA. It hosts locals sporting events and concerts.

Sports venues in Alabama
Indoor arenas in Alabama
Buildings and structures in Dothan, Alabama